Koosje van Voorn,  (15 January 1935 – 5 August 2018) was a freestyle swimmer from the Netherlands. She competed in the 100 m and 4 × 100 m relay events at the 1952 Summer Olympics and won a silver medal in the relay, alongside Marie-Louise Linssen-Vaessen, Irma Heijting-Schuhmacher and Hannie Termeulen.

References

External links

1935 births
2018 deaths
Swimmers at the 1952 Summer Olympics
Olympic swimmers of the Netherlands
Olympic silver medalists for the Netherlands
Sportspeople from Groningen (city)
Medalists at the 1952 Summer Olympics
Dutch female freestyle swimmers
Olympic silver medalists in swimming
Universiade medalists in swimming
Universiade bronze medalists for the Netherlands
Medalists at the 1959 Summer Universiade
20th-century Dutch women